Since 1999, Indonesia has had a multi-party system. In the four legislative elections since the fall of the New Order regime, no political party has won an overall majority of seats, resulting in coalition governments.

Pursuant to the Indonesian political parties act, political parties' ideologies "must not be against Pancasila" and "is an explanation of Pancasila".

Overview

The Indonesian political party system is regulated by Act No. 2 of 2008 on Political Parties. The law defines political party as "a national organisation founded by like-minded Indonesian citizens with common goals to fulfill common interests and to defend the unity of the Unitary State of the Republic of Indonesia as based on Pancasila and the 1945 State Constitution of the Republic of Indonesia".

Political parties must register themselves with the Ministry of Law and Human Rights to be recognised by the authority. The law dictates that political parties' registration criteria shall include a notarial act recognising the party establishment and party constitution; a document describing party symbols; address of party headquarters and prove of distribution of party local offices in provinces, and cities and regencies; and a prove of party bank account. The law also dictates minimum membership of new political parties on 50 persons, with the percentage of woman members and allocation of woman members to party offices are set on a minimum of 30%.

The party must undergo another registration process in order to participate in national elections; the registration shall be submitted to the General Elections Commission (KPU). Political parties whose had their registration declined by the electoral commission due to failure to satisfy administrative criteria or other reasons, are able to appeal their rejection to the General Election Supervisory Agency (BAWASLU).

Party principles

Indonesian political parties should recognise the superiority of Pancasila and the national constitution, but Indonesian law tolerates the practice of other ideologies not in violation of the Pancasila and the constitution. A 1966 Provisional People's Consultative Assembly resolution still in force today, however, explicitly prohibits establishment of a communist party, and political parties are banned from adopting "Communism/Marxism-Leninism" (sic; explicitly defined in the resolution's corresponding explanatory memorandum to include "the struggle fundaments and tactics taught by ... Stalin, Mao Tse Tung et cetera") as the party ideology.

In essence, Indonesian political parties differs little on party policy and ideology. The only major difference between Indonesian parties is their position as to how major a role Islam, by far the nation's majority religion, should play in public affairs. This tendency resulting in several Indonesian political parties to brand itself as the part of nationalist-religious broad coalition in order to attract potential voters from both Muslim and secular nationalist groups.

The language of the left–right political spectrum is seldom used in Indonesia, in contrast with other countries. This tendency arose as the result of the New Order regime under Suharto which was anathema to left-wing policies after the 1965–66 Indonesian mass killings of members and supporters of the Communist Party of Indonesia. The New Order regime further stigmatised left-wing ideals as those espoused only by communists, discouraging Indonesian political parties from identifying themselves as left-wing movements lest they lose potential voters and be accused as communist. This tendency has survived even after the 1998 Reforms, partly due to the new regime's insistence on keeping anti-communist legislation in force.

Parties represented in legislatures

Parties represented in national and regional legislatures

Parties represented only in regional legislatures
These parties participates on national elections - the last was in 2019 - yet failed to attain a single seat in the DPR due to failing to pass 4% parliamentary threshold. Notable failure was of Hanura, that was failed to return to DPR despite winning seats in 2014 election. Despite electoral failure in the DPR, these parties successfully gain seat in regional parliaments (DPRD).

Aceh special autonomy statutes allowed formation of local political parties to compete only in the People's Representative Council of Aceh. Although the party number is serialised from the national list, Aceh local parties only appeared in ballot paper circulating in Aceh province.

Extra-parliamentary parties
These political parties have no representation in either national or regional parliaments.

The term "partai gurem" (minor party, literally "tropical fowl mite party" referring to the small size) is commonly used by Indonesian media to refer to these political parties. The term initially referred to political parties that won a very small number of parliamentary seat, but after the 2004 election, to political parties that have no chance of surpassing the parliamentary threshold (currently 4%) necessary to gain representation on the People's Representative Council. These political parties are often perceived to be lacking in organisational structure, their leaders seemingly interested solely in attracting media attention.

These parties often have their attempts at registering for elections turned down by the KPU due to the parties' failure to satisfy registration criteria set by the commission, which includes completeness of party documents, a permanent physical party headquarters, minimum membership and minimum percentage of woman members. Parties that had their registration rejected often resort to appealing their rejection to the Bawaslu, with varied success.

Historical political parties

Political parties participating in 1955 and 1971 elections

Political parties of the New Order

After his rise into power, President Suharto expressed his discontent regarding multiple political parties, arguing that the failure of Konstituante in 1955-1959 was caused by party deadlock - unacceptable his regime. He proposed that existing political parties unite based on their ideological essence – either spiritual (religious) or materialist (secular nationalist) - in order to cripple the resulting umbrella parties with infighting. Political parties' reaction to Suharto's propositions was generally positive, with Islamic parties claiming that party fusion was in line with their last National Islamic Congress resolution agreed in 1969. A political alliance dubbed the "Democratic Development Group" was formed by the PNI, the IPKI, Parkindo, the Murba Party, and the Catholic Party to compete in 1971 election.

After 1971 election, New Order regime reiterated its call for political parties to fuse, and a MPR ordinance regulating political parties grouping issued in 1973 further pressured political parties to merge.

All Islamic political parties merged to form the United Development Party (PPP) on 5 January 1973, and the remaining nationalist and non-Islamic political parties united to form the Indonesian Democratic Party (PDI) on 10 January 1973. Golkar, officially a "federation of public organisations" but effectively a political party, remained dominant for the entirety of the New Order. From 1985, all political parties were required to declare national ideology Pancasila as their "one and only ideological basis".

The parties participated for the last time in the 1997 election, and the three-party system survived until the collapse of the New Order in 1998 Reformasi. Ensuing political liberalisation allowed establishment of multitudes of new political parties, with the number of political parties participating in 1999 election jumping substantially to 48 parties.

After the Reform, the PPP survived and continues to participate in all following elections after 1999, albeit with much of its membership having broken off from it and founded their own parties. Golkar too was made a proper party and exists to this day. The PDI failed to imitate the post-Suharto successes of the PPP and Golkar after the government intervened and unseated Chairman Megawati Soekarnoputri, causing PDI support to collapse in the 1997 election. PDI votes further eroded as support instead went to its breakaway Indonesian Democratic Party - Struggle (PDI-P), led by Megawati in the post-Suharto 1999 election, resulting in the party winning only two seats in contrast to the PDI-P's 153 seats. After poor electoral performance and failure to register for the 2004 election, PDI rebranded itself as the Indonesian Democratic Vanguard Party (PPDI) in 2003.

Political parties in post-reform era

Parties participating only in 1999 elections
Following political liberalisation after the collapse of the New Order regime in 1998 Reformasi, registration for new political parties jumped significantly. As the result, the following 1999 election had 48 political parties competing for DPR seats, compared to the previous 1997 election that saw only 2 political parties plus Golkar.

Several parties claimed inheritance from former political parties existing prior to the New Order era, resulting in parties sharing similar political party names, with faction names as the only characteristics that made those parties distinct from each other. Example on this case was on claimants to the heritage of the former Indonesian National Party (PNI) and Masyumi Party.

Most of the parties failed to gain even a single seat due to lack of votes. After the new electoral law authorised the use of a parliamentary threshold to determine the division of DPR seats, those parties were forced to reorganise themselves in order to be able to register for the next 2004 election.

Below is the list of political parties participating only in the 1999 election which failed to participate in the next 2004 election.

Pre-independence organisations

Others

See also
 Politics of Indonesia
 List of political parties by country
 List of youth wings of political parties in Indonesia

References
Feith, Herbert (2007) The Decline of Constitutional Democracy in Indonesia  Equinox Publishing (Asia) Pte Ltd, 
 Ricklefs, M.C. (1991). A history of modern Indonesia since c.1200. Stanford: Stanford University Press.

Notes

Citations

Indonesia
 
Political parties
Political parties
Indonesia